ChoroQ (known as Choro Q HG 4 in Japan) is a PlayStation 2 game published by Atlus in the US, Zoo Digital Publishing in PAL regions and Takara in Japan.  It was developed by Barnhouse Effect.  The game is marketed as a "Car-PG": a hybrid of driving and role-playing video games.

Plot 
Using events from the movie, #5 must prepare for and enter the 2004 Grand Prix and beat Otto of Team Getra at his grand prix.

Chapter 1 
"Here's the Rival": The game opens with Norahike dreaming about a race. It includes him, his friend Norkia, and Otto, the emperor of the races. Norkia dies after a fateful crash into the wall, and when Norahike wakes up, he realises that it is all true and that Otto may not be emperor for very long. #5 enters shortly after. A smart blue car called Barat tells him that he must join a team to race at the Grand Prix.

"Here Are the Tough Chicks!": #5 is out driving in town at night when two cars, Bidalt and Daktan, challenge him to a race. The bet is if he loses they take all his money. #5 accepts the challenge and narrowly wins the race. Bidalt says that he will let #5 go this time.

"Meet Norahike By Fate": Norahike stops where the two have been racing and Bidalt and Daktan are easily scared and run away. He tells #5 not to waste his talent playing stupid games because he is a car and has to dream big and be a GP racer. Also, he is told that Norahike will listen to his problems.

"Heard About the Emperor": #5 goes to Letoba's Cafe where Letoba tells him about Otto. He disappeared after Norkia's death 20 years ago and only races when he feels like it.

"Eskan Challenges!": A Smart car called Eskan waits for #5 at Sobka Brachy School and tells him he is not a racer, but if he wins a race against him, then he will believe the young car. When #5 wins, Eskan says he will let him win by staying at the starting line.

"Race Against Draoga!": #5 discovers a new tunnel, which leads to Poqui Town. When he arrives, there is a Hang-Out. Draoga, Budbach (who owns the haunted house), and Eskan are all gathered. It turns out that Eskan is Draoga's kid brother and when he told on him that #5 beat him, he challenges the Peugeot to a race, which #5 gradually wins.

"Joined the Tough Chicks": Draoga accepts defeat at last and asks #5 if he would like to be a member of the Tough Chicks and #5 zooms off as if to say no. Draoga shrugs and says "I see, I see. Then I don't want to be friends with you then."

Chapter 2 
"Barat Challenges!": Barat meets #5 at Poqui fountain and says that they can't have 1 on 1 races on normal courses, so he has come up with a street race idea: to go around the town's outer circuit three times. When #5 wins, Barat tells him not to be upset because #5 beat him. The young car gives Barat the key chain as a token of friendship. Barat gives him a CD in return. It has his theme song.

"Barat Joins the Team!": Barat posts #5 a letter to say that he has joined a team (Pomnik) and that he will still make his world stage debut. He tells him that he should join a team too, which #5 accepts.

"Joined a Team!": #5 goes to a third tunnel, Nyaky Town, where the entire town is built on water. He goes to Sovass Headquarters and prepares to knock Olstri and Kaybert's socks off. However, to join, #5 must pass a tryout at Sky Highway. After #5 accomplishes this, Kaybert welcomes him to the team and says he can play in the Pro Cup as a member of Team Sovass. Olstri gives him 1000000G and says he will get his revenge the next time he races with him.

"Race Barat at the Pro Cup!": #5 and Barat meet at the booking point and Barat is surprised that they are racing together on the professional track. He wishes him look and tells him to do his best. However, #5 wins again and Barat tells him that his competition has just begun.

"Meet Lafnek": #5 goes to Poqui Drinks, where the owner, Gelunda, tells him that a mechanic named Lafnek is here. Lafnek talks to the young racer and says that they can't do the test at the bar because the customers will spew up. When the machine is fixed, the useful mechanic gives #5 something good, an Experiment Ticket.

"The Tough Chicks Cheer!": Draoga congratulates #5 on being enrolled in Grand Prix. The Tough Chicks hold a parade, which includes Draoga, Eskan, Bidalt, Daktan, and Budbach. #5 likes this and says, "Thanks guys!" Draoga says they will be cheering for him, and not to lose the race. He gives him spoiler parts for luck. #5 feels confident and wins with Team Sovass.

Chapter 3 
"A Newspaper Interview": Journalist Kyapa congratulates #5 for his great performance at the Grand Prix. She asks for an interview. After being asked if #5 exerted his full power, how his team was, etc., she goes to write an article in her office at Choroyter Times.

"Race Barat at the GP!": Barat's dream has come true – he and #5 will be racing in the Grand Prix. After 5 races, Barat sees #5 on the first place podium and tells him that #5 won that time, but he would beat him at the GP. #5 gets yet another interview.

"Visit Barat at the Hospital": Barat is in Murtica Hospital, so #5 visits him. Barat explains that the problem was he had an issue with his gear and that he thinks he raced too much. He tells #5 to improve his skill while he is not at his best.

"The Ghost from Grand Prix's Past": Gelunda tells #5 Poqui Town has become excited about the races, all because of him. She tells him about Otto, who was a great match for the Nyaky nobles. After Norkia died, he hid from the public in his palace in Nyaky. As Otto was a born racer, all he did was race. He began entering the Tough Race which is an unauthorised wild race, which people can enter without a valid licence. Gelunda will throw up, so she is closing the shop early.

"Place Flowers at the Grave": #5 picks up a bouquet from Cherny's Flowers. Then, he goes to Poqui Cemetery to place them on Norkia's grave. Norkia rises from the dead and tells him he must report to Norahike's house. When #5 arrives, Norahike cries over the news, gives #5 a CD with his theme song, and tells him to leave.

Chapter 4 
"Ania Challenges!": Gelunda gives #5 a ChoroQ coin that once belonged to Otto. #5 then travels to Nyaky Town's cafe, where Arbuk takes it and welcomes him in. When #5 tells him that he is looking for Miss Ania, Ania drives over to him and challenges him to a practice game. When #5 wins the challenge, Ania tells him not to be flattered, unless he beats Sir Otto. She gives him a Letter of reference and drives off.

"Promise the GP With Otto": #5 arrives at Getra Palace, where Hollikost the guard accepts the letter and tells him he can go through. Otto meets him at the throne and tells him he is well known at Grand Prix racing, but he no longer races there. When #5 begs, he finally agrees to race at the Grand Prix – just once. He will let #5 know the schedule in the future and that he looks forward to seeing him in the race.

"Aim to Win With Barat!": When #5 applies for the next Grand Prix, he goes to Murtica Hospital. After pondering outside the operation room, he overhears Murtica telling Barat he has a serious disease. When #5 finally enters the room, Barat tells him to win against Otto as it is his battle of the century, but he cannot go see it. He will not let any lame disease get him. He tells #5 that if he doesn't beat Otto, he will face the wrath of Barat. #5 finally agrees that he will win.

"Norahike/Ania at Church": At Nyaky Church, Ania goes to see Norahike. It turns out that Ania is Norahike's niece. She was glad he convinced her dad who said girls shouldn't be racing. Ania raced day after day after that, but worries that her uncle is still thinking about Otto, as he is going to hit him once more. Ania complains that Norahike shouldn't use people for his own revenge.

Chapter 5 
"Race 1 - Dungeon Heat M": Otto tells #5 that he has unrefined talent and that he will still be victorious. He won't let #5 win easily as he leads Team Getra, the world's strongest team. #5 uses Twin V10 Engine to win the race because Otto got to the first place quickly.

"Race 2 - Good Old American S-L": Journalist Kyapa commentates on what is a super long version of Good Old American which is completely different from the one in Norahike's dream. #5 does his best to defeat Otto as the Getra leader got into last place. #5 is rammed off a couple of times by hostile team Megbeth. The Sovass trickster fools them by driving into a ditch and wins.

"Race 3 - Trans-Trip S": In the third race of Otto's GP, Bernice goes like The Clappers as he wins the race, leaving #5 and Otto with nothing to aim for. In the middle of the race (lap 3), all cars are guided by the pace car after an accident involving Shutiege (Getra) and Kaybert (Sovass). Ralf replaces Shutiege for the last 2 races. Olstri also replaces Kaybert.

"Race 4 - Toy Dream Circuit M": #5 had raced on this before, so he knew that the small steps can be fatal. #5 wins yet again, with Otto and Ralf planning a revenge for the final race.

"Race 5 - Sky Highway M": Otto slingshots at the start of the race just to give himself a head start and it is almost impossible to catch up with him. On lap 3, Barat's ghost tells #5 to follow his sixth sense. #5 drives through the rings to succeed and win Otto!

"Win Otto, Clear the Game!": Otto congratulates #5 on his victory. He tells him about the accident, but also says a race is never without incident, which brings back memories from his racing days; he wishes #5 luck in his glory days. The celebration is short-lived, however, as Kyapa informs #5 that Barat died just before the last race. Back in Brachy Town, the town holds a parade for #5 on becoming Emperor of the Races, to which #5 quietly says, "Thank you Barat. I'll never forget you in all my life." #5 and his friends later go on a road trip. He doesn't know where the road takes them. It's a big country.

Reception 

The game received "generally unfavorable reviews" according to the review aggregation website Metacritic. In Japan, Famitsu gave it a score of three sevens and one six, for a total of 27 out of 40.

References

External links 

2003 video games
Atlus games
Takara video games
Racing video games
PlayStation 2 games
PlayStation 2-only games
Video games based on Takara Tomy toys
Video games developed in Japan
Barnhouse Effect games
Multiplayer and single-player video games